Hans Christian Christoffersen (9 October 1882 – 3 March 1966) was a Norwegian chess player, three-times Norwegian Chess Championship winner (1926, 1929, 1936).

Biography
Hans Christian Christoffersen was photographer by profession. In 1905, he was one of the founders of the chess club in Drammen. In the 1930s Hans Christian Christoffersen was one of the leading Norwegian chess players. He three times won the Norwegian Chess Championship: in 1926, 1929 and 1936.

Hans Christian Christoffersen played for Norway in the Chess Olympiads:
 In 1931, at first board in the 4th Chess Olympiad in Prague (+1, =1, -12),
 In 1937, at reserve board in the 7th Chess Olympiad in Stockholm (+1, =3, -7).

Hans Christian Christoffersen played for Norway in the unofficial Chess Olympiad:
 In 1936, at first board in the 3rd unofficial Chess Olympiad in Munich (+1, =4, -9).

References

External links

Hans Christian Christoffersen chess games at 365chess.com

1882 births
1966 deaths
Norwegian chess players
Chess Olympiad competitors